This is a comprehensive index of commercial first-person shooter video games, sorted alphabetically by title. The developer, platform, and release date are provided where available. The table can be sorted by clicking on the small boxes next to the column headings.



List

Initially items sorted alphabetically by "title". The table can be sorted by a different column via clicking on the small box next to column heading.

Legend

See also
 List of freeware first-person shooters
 Chart of first-person shooters by release year and graphics engine

References

First-person shooters